Tullywiggan (possibly ) is a small village outside Cookstown, County Tyrone, Northern Ireland. It lies within the civil parish of Derryloran, the historic barony of Dungannon Upper, and is situated within Cookstown District Council.

Excavations have shown signs of a New Stone Age and early Bronze Age settlement.

References

See also 
List of villages in Northern Ireland
List of towns in Northern Ireland

Villages in County Tyrone
Civil parish of Derryloran
Cookstown District Council